Valarie Wilson is the former chair of the City Schools of Decatur Board and former president of the Georgia School Boards Association (2012-2013). She is the Democratic nominee for Georgia Superintendent of Schools in the 2014 election. Wilson was endorsed for the Democratic nomination by the Georgia Association of Educators as well as the Georgia Federation of Teachers.

During her professional career in local government, Wilson served as Deputy Director and later Director of the Fulton County Human Services Department.

References

External links
Valarie Wilson for Georgia State School Superintendent campaign site

Living people
Georgia (U.S. state) Democrats
Year of birth missing (living people)